McGinley is an Irish surname. Notable people with the surname include:

Bernard McGinley (born 1946), American judge
Billy McGinley (born 1954), Scottish footballer
Ciaran McGinley, Irish Gaelic footballer
Conde McGinley (1890–1963), American publisher
Cormac McGinley, Irish Gaelic footballer
Dinny McGinley (born 1945), Irish politician
Donald McGinley (1920–2005), American lawyer and politician
Ed McGinley (1899–1985), American football player
Enda McGinley (born 1981), Irish Gaelic footballer
Eugene McGinley, Canadian politician
Jim McGinley (1878–1961), American baseball player
John McGinley (born 1959), English footballer
John C. McGinley (born 1959), American actor
Joseph McGinley, Irish politician
Mark Anthony McGinley, Irish Gaelic footballer
Martin McGinley, Irish fiddler
Matt McGinley (born 1983), American drummer
Matthew McGinley (born 1988), Scottish footballer
Michael McGinley, Irish songwriter
Mick McGinley (born 1940/1), Irish Gaelic footballer and father of professional golfer Paul
Noel McGinley, Irish Gaelic footballer
Patrick McGinley (born 1937), Irish writer
Paul McGinley (born 1966), Irish golfer and son of Gaelic footballer Mick
Peter McGinley (born 1970s), Irish Gaelic footballer
Philip McGinley (born 1981), English actor
Phyllis McGinley (1905–1978), American writer
Ryan McGinley (born 1977), American photographer
Seán McGinley (born ca. 1956), Irish actor
Ted McGinley (born 1958), American actor
Tim McGinley (1854–1899), American baseball player